Halappa Basappa Achar is an Indian politician who is the Cabinet Minister of Mines & Geology, Minister of Women & Child Development, Disabled & Senior citizens empowerment, Government of Karnataka since 4 August 2021. He is district in charge minister for Dharwad District. He is a member of Karnataka Legislative Assembly from Yelburga constituency. He was previously elected as a Member of Karnataka Legislative Council from Raichur local authorities constituency in 2010.

Early life and education
Halappa Achar was born on December 01, 1952, to the couple Shri. Basappa Shivappa Achar and Smt. Gauramma Basappa Achar. He has completed his graduation in BSc. He selected agriculture as his choice and went on to become an exemplary farmer.. With his 12 acres of farm land, his monumental efforts to bring in bore well water to his land far from 4-5 kilometers has won accolades from farm community. He also won Best farmer award from the then Union Minister for Agriculture Shri Balram Jhakar for his grape crops. He continued farming for 10years and became a role model farmer of his taluk. He is married to Smt. Ratnamma.

Political career 
He was elected as Director of Masaba Hanchinal Cooperative bank in 1976. He entered politics by becoming Vice-chairman of TAPCMS at Yelburga in 1978. He is known for revamping of taluk level Cooperative societies.

Sahakara Ratna
Halappa Achar became director of RDCC Bank in 1988-89 and revived it that was under huge loss and at the edge of bankruptcy. Recognising his efforts in reviving the bank, Karnataka government under the leadership of then CM HD Kumaraswamy honoured him with ‘Sahakara Ratna’ award.

Elected as MLC
He was elected as MLC in 2010 by contesting from Local bodies on a BJP ticket and emerged victorious with highest margin (400 votes) representing Raichur and  Koppal districts for 6 years. He successfully utilised his MLCLAD funds for implementing minor irrigation projects in his constituency. Later in the year 2013, he succeeded to get sanction of Rs 1000 Crore for Yelburga Bevuru irrigation project from the then Chief Minister Shri. Jagadeesh Shetter.

As President of Karnataka State Cooperative Marketing Federation
When he took over as President of Karnataka State Cooperative Marketing Federation in 2011, this institution was also under bankruptcy. It was under a debt of Rs.36 Crore to the government. Halappa Achar revived the institution and continued as President of the board for 7 years, Under his presidency the institution repaid all the outstanding debts, and it became independent with a profit of Rs 35 Crore by the end of his tenure.

As Director of IFFCO and Apex Bank
With his vast experience in the field, he became director of IFFCO and Apex Bank for 10 years. He was also President of Hampi Foundation Authority Trust from 2012-13 to 2014-15.

Public Service
He has been arranging free coaching in Kuknoor, Hirevankalakunta and Masaba Hanchinal for poor children to prepare for Navodaya, Sainik School, Kittur Rani Chennamma school and various other entrance exams. He continues to motivate young students in the field of education with emphasis and support for the same.

Rejuvenation of Lakes in Yelburga Constituency
With his own expense, Halappa Achar has rejuvenated Karamudi, Mandalagiri, Mandalamari, Linganabandi and various other lakes in his constituency. With a good rain fall all these lakes have been filled now. This has benefitted thousands of families helping various farmers and residents around the region.

Example for Transparency
With the support of all the directors of RDCC Bank, Apex Bank and Karnataka State cooperative Marketing Board, he has been known for conducting recruitment of staff for these institutions transparently on merit basis.

Member of Legislative Assembly
He defeated former minister of Congress party Basavaraj Rayareddy with a margin of 13000 votes in 2018 election  and entered Assembly for the first time. With his relentless efforts, he has succeeded to get sanction of Rs.1729 crore for the 3rd phase of  Koppal irrigation project. It is imperative to say he became the minister in his first entry to the assembly itself.

References

1952 births
Living people
Karnataka MLAs 2018–2023
Bharatiya Janata Party politicians from Karnataka
Members of the Karnataka Legislative Council
People from Koppal district